Charles Messerey "Lefty" Edens (September 17, 1897 – July 29, 1939) was an American football, basketball, and baseball coach.

Biography
He served as the head football coach at North Texas Agricultural College—now the University of Texas at Arlington—from 1923 to 1924 and at Southwestern University in Georgetown, Texas from 1925 to 1938, compiling a record of 56–82–17.  The University of Texas at Arlington discontinued its football team after completion of the 1985 season.  Edens was also the head basketball coach at Southwestern from 1925 to 1939 and the baseball coach at the school from 1926 to 1928. He has two grandchildren. 

Edens died when he drowned during a fishing trip to the Colorado River in July 1939.

Head coaching record

Football

References

External links
 

1897 births
1939 deaths
Southwestern Pirates baseball coaches
Southwestern Pirates football coaches
Southwestern Pirates men's basketball coaches
Texas–Arlington Mavericks football coaches
People from Bertram, Texas
Deaths by drowning in the United States
Accidental deaths in Texas
Basketball coaches from Texas